Kildare of Storm is a lost 1918 American silent drama film produced and distributed by Metro Pictures and directed by Harry L. Franklin. It stars Broadway actress Emily Stevens. June Mathis and Jere F. Looney provided the scenario.

Plot
As described in a film magazine, Kate (Stevens), urged on by her ambitious mother (Lindroth), weds Basil Kildare (Baggot), the last of the famous Kildares of Kentucky, and goes to Storm, the family estate, to live. Her husband proves to be a beast, and Kate and Dr. Jacques Benoix (Kent), Basil's best friend, fall in love despite their mutual knowledge that they should not. When Basil is slain, Jacques is convicted of murder. He is pardoned after five years and devotes his life to curing the sick at a mountain sanitarium. Mahaly (Short), former housekeeper to the Kildares, comes to the sanitarium and confesses on her deathbed that it was she that slew Basil because he had wronged her. Exonerated before the world, Dr. Benoix feels justified in claiming his happiness with Kate.

Cast
Emily Stevens as Kate Kildare
King Baggot as Basil Kildare
Crauford Kent as Dr. Jacques Benoix
Florence Short as Mahaly
Edwards Davis as Gov. Claiborne
Helen Lindroth as Mrs. Leigh
Maggie Breyer as Mrs. Benoix
Fred Warren (Undetermined role) (credited as Fred H. Warren)

Reception
Like many American films of the time, Kildare of Storm was subject to cuts by city and state film censorship boards. For example, the Chicago Board of Censors required a cut, in Reel 1, two closeups of baby in crib to include the first kidnapping scene, and, Reel 4, two closeups of men fighting on the ground.

References

External links

Still portrait from the film (University of Washington, Sayre collection)

1918 films
Lost American films
Metro Pictures films
Films based on American novels
1918 drama films
Silent American drama films
American black-and-white films
American silent feature films
Films directed by Harry L. Franklin
1918 lost films
Lost drama films
1910s American films